Scatter the Ashes was an American post-punk band signed to the Epitaph label. They were formed in the summer of 2001 and played their first show on June 24, 2001, at the Plunge in Nashville. In 2006, they officially broke up, and two of the four members of the group went on to form a new band, MOTHER/FATHER. Demos for their unreleased second album appeared on guiltypeople.org in May 2011.

Members

Daryl Stamps - Vocal melodies 
James Robert Farmer aka "Bob" - Guitars 
Matt McChord - Bass 
Dillon Napier - Drums (formally of Point of You? and Second Childhood)
DJ Savage - DJ and Sound FX
Thaddeus Sparkman - Guitar
Ryan Johnson - Guitar (formally of Disposed) 
Anthony Lillie - Percussion

Discography
Devout / The Modern Hymn (2004, Epitaph Records)
Construct Set (2005, Epitaph Records)

Compilations
 Punk-O-Rama Vol. 9
 Punk-O-Rama Vol. 10

References

External links

 DJSaVaGe.Com

American post-hardcore musical groups
Epitaph Records artists